The following is a list of notable deaths in April 2010.

Entries for each day are listed alphabetically by surname. A typical entry lists information in the following sequence:
 Name, age, country of citizenship at birth, subsequent country of citizenship (if applicable), reason for notability, cause of death (if known), and reference.

April 2010

1
Morag Beaton, 83, Scottish-born Australian operatic soprano.
Vito De Grisantis, 68, Italian Roman Catholic prelate, Bishop of Ugento-Santa Maria di Leuca (2000–2010).
Anders Eklund, 52, Swedish boxer.
John Forsythe, 92, American actor (Bachelor Father, Charlie's Angels, Dynasty), complications from pneumonia.
Paul Fry, 45, British motorcycle speedway rider.
Buddy Gorman, 88, American actor (Bowery Boys, Dead End Kids), natural causes.
Julia Lang, 88, British actress, radio presenter.
Yuri Maslyukov, 72, Russian politician, Vice Premier of Soviet Union (1988–1990) and Russia (1998–1999).
Lek Nana, 85, Thai businessman and politician, heart failure.
Ed Roberts, 68, American computer pioneer, pneumonia.
Tzannis Tzannetakis, 82, Greek politician, Prime Minister (1989).

2
Israr Ahmad, 69, Indian nuclear physicist.
Butch Allison, 65, American football player.
Roman Bannwart, 90, Swiss theologian and musician.
Din Beramboi, 43, Malaysian comedian, actor and radio DJ, hemorrhagic dengue fever.
Mike Cuellar, 72, Cuban Major League Baseball player, stomach cancer.
Ashari Danudirdjo, 87, Indonesian Olympic sailor.
Edward Dmytro, 78, Canadian jurist, Chief Justice of Saskatchewan (1981–2006).
Dávid Daróczi, 37, Hungarian journalist, suicide.
David Halliday, 94, American physicist.
Arne Høyer, 81, Danish Olympic bronze medal-winning (1960) sprint canoer.
Chris Kanyon, 40, American professional wrestler (WCW, WWF), suicide by drug overdose.
Per Lyngemark, 68, Danish Olympic gold medal-winning (1968) cyclist.
Sonia McMahon, Lady McMahon, 77, Australian socialite, widow of former Prime Minister Sir William McMahon, cancer.
Thomas J. Moyer, 70, American jurist, Chief Justice of the Ohio Supreme Court (1987–2010).
Carolyn Rodgers, 69, American poet, cancer.
William Soeryadjaya, 87, Indonesian businessman, founder of Astra International.
Frances Claudia Wright, 91, Sierra Leonean barrister.
Mike Zwerin, 79, American jazz musician and jazz critic, after long illness.

3
Romano Alquati, 75, Italian sociologist, political theorist and activist.
Crosaire, 92, Irish-born Zimbabwean compiler of the Irish Times crossword since 1943.
Oleg Kopayev, 72, Russian footballer, Soviet Top League top scorer (1963, 1965).
Roland MacLeod, 74, British actor (Coronation Street, The Fall and Rise of Reginald Perrin).
Ian McKay, 87, Australian footballer.
Craig Noel, 94, American theatre producer, director and administrator of the Old Globe Theatre, natural causes.
Jim Pagliaroni, 72, American baseball player (Boston Red Sox, Oakland Athletics), cancer.
Ferdinand Simoneit, 84, German journalist, author and World War II veteran.
Eugène Terre'Blanche, 69, South African white separatist leader, beating.
Jesús Vásquez, 89, Peruvian singer.
Yasunori Watanabe, 35, Japanese rugby player, hit by train.

4
Mahmoud Abdel-Aal, 81, Egyptian gymnast.
Lajos Bálint, 80, Hungarian-born Romanian Roman Catholic prelate, archbishop of Alba Iulia (1990–1993).
Sir Alec Bedser, 91, English cricketer.
Matt Cook, 22, Canadian ice sledge hockey player, bone cancer.
Clifford M. Hardin, 94, American politician, Secretary of Agriculture (1969–1971), natural causes.
Rudy Kousbroek, 80, Dutch essayist.
Lori Martin, 62, American actor (Cape Fear, National Velvet), suicide by gunshot.
Kelly Moran, 49, American motorcycle speedway racer, complications from emphysema.
Abubakar Rimi, 70, Nigerian politician. 
Shio Satō, 59, Japanese manga artist, brain tumor.
Henry Scarpelli, 79, American comic book artist (Archie), after long illness.
Friedrich Wilhelm Schäfke, 87, German mathematician and academic.
Erich Zenger, 70, German Roman Catholic theologian and Bible scholar.

5
Jim Edwards, 83, New Zealand politician.
Jerry Elliott, 73, American jurist, Kansas Court of Appeals (since 1987), cancer.
Lothar Engelhardt, 70, German military scientist.
Günther C. Kirchberger, 81, German academic and painter.
William Neill, 88, British poet.
Helen Ranney, 89, American hematologist.
Molefi Sefularo, 52, South African politician, car crash.
Vitaly Sevastyanov, 74, Russian Soviet cosmonaut.
Gisela Trowe, 86, German actress.

6
Janet Adelman, 69, American literary critic.
James Aubrey, 62, British actor (Lord of the Flies, Bouquet of Barbed Wire, Spy Game), pancreatitis.
Eddie Carroll, 76, Canadian voice actor (Jiminy Cricket).
Vinnie Chas, 47, American bassist (Pretty Boy Floyd).
Anatoly Dobrynin, 90, Russian diplomat and politician, Soviet Ambassador to the United States (1962–1986).
Jack Flannery, 57, American off-road racer, cancer.
Ricardo Lavié, 87, Argentine actor, after long illness.
Guillermo Luca de Tena, 82, Spanish journalist.
Tony MacGibbon, 85, New Zealand cricketer.
Wilma Mankiller, 64, American activist, first female Principal Chief of the Cherokee Nation (1985–1995), pancreatic cancer.
Katsumi Nishikawa, 91, Japanese film director, pneumonia.
Grete Olsen, 98, Danish Olympic fencer.
David Quayle, 73, British businessman (B&Q).
Tom Ray, 90, American animator (Looney Tunes, Tom and Jerry, Animaniacs).
Corin Redgrave, 70, British actor and political activist, after short illness.
Hans Schröder, 79, German sculptor and painter.
Herbert Spiro, 85, German-born American political scientist, United States Ambassador to Cameroon (1975–1977)
Sid Storey, 90, English footballer.
Dimitris Tsiogas, 54, Greek politician, member of Parliament (2001–2008), cancer.
Luigi Waites, 82, American jazz drummer and vibraphonist.

7
Christopher Cazenove, 64, English actor (Dynasty, A Knight's Tale, Zulu Dawn), sepsis.
Dixieland Band, 30, American Thoroughbred racehorse, euthanized.
Hermina Franks, 95, American baseball player (AAGPBL).
Graciela, 94, Cuban singer, renal and pulmonary failure.
Eddie Johnson, 89, American jazz musician, pneumonia.
Takuya Kimura, 37, Japanese baseball player and coach, subarachnoid hemorrhage.
Oscar Kramer, 74, Argentine film producer, after long illness.
Chris Limahelu, 59, American football place kicker (USC), prostate cancer.
J. Bruce Llewellyn, 82, American businessman and activist, a founder of 100 Black Men of America, renal failure.
George Nissen, 96, American gymnast, co-inventor of the trampoline, pneumonia.
Betty Paraskevas, 81, American writer and lyricist, pancreatic cancer.
Ramchandra Siras, 62, Indian linguist and author.
Valentin Turchin, 79, Russian-born American computer scientist and human rights activist.

8
Babá, 75, Brazilian footballer.
Mark Colville, 4th Viscount Colville of Culross, 76, British judge and hereditary peer.
Willie Farrell, 81, Irish politician.
Antony Flew, 87, British philosopher, after long illness.
Guy Kewney, 63, British technology journalist (Personal Computer World), colorectal cancer.
Aladár Kovácsi, 77, Hungarian modern pentathlete, Olympic gold medalist (Helsinki 1952).
Andreas Kunze, 57, German actor, heart failure.
Malcolm McLaren, 64, British musician and band manager (Sex Pistols, New York Dolls, Bow Wow Wow), mesothelioma.
Abel Muzorewa, 84, Zimbabwean Methodist bishop and politician, Prime Minister of Zimbabwe Rhodesia (1979).
Richard Olasz, 79, American politician, member of the Pennsylvania House of Representatives (1981–1998).
Personal Ensign, 26, American Thoroughbred racehorse, Hall of Famer, natural causes.
Al Prince, 67, American-born French Polynesian journalist and tourism expert, after long illness.
Jean-Paul Proust, 70, Monégasque politician, Minister of State (2005–2010).
John Schoenherr, 74, American illustrator, Caldecott Medal winner, chronic obstructive pulmonary disease.
Teddy Scholten, 83, Dutch singer.

9
Bob Franks, 58, American politician, member of the House of Representatives from New Jersey (1993–2001), cancer.
Alastair Dowell, 89, Scottish cricketer.
John Griffiths, 57, Welsh museum curator.
Hisashi Inoue, 75, Japanese pacifist playwright, lung cancer.
Meir Just, 101, Dutch rabbi, Chief Rabbi of the Netherlands.
Robert Lau, 68, Malaysian politician, Deputy Minister for Transport, liver cancer.
Gisela Karau, 78, German author, editor and columnist, after long illness.
Dario Mangiarotti, 94, Italian fencer, Olympic gold (1952) and silver (1948, 1952) medalist.
Kenneth McKellar, 82, Scottish singer, pancreatic cancer.
Jacob O. Meyer, 75, American religious sect leader (Assemblies of Yahweh).
Meinhardt Raabe, 94, American actor (The Wizard of Oz), heart attack.
Peter Ramsbotham, 3rd Viscount Soulbury, 90, British diplomat and politician, Governor of Bermuda (1977–1980).
Lou Ritter, 84, American politician, Mayor of Jacksonville, Florida (1965–1967), cancer.
Guyford Stever, 93, American educator and science adviser, President of Carnegie Mellon University (1965–1972).
Kerstin Thorvall, 84, Swedish author, illustrator and journalist, after long illness.
Pierre Trottier, 85, Canadian novelist.
Zoltán Varga, 65, Hungarian footballer.

10
Dixie Carter, 70, American actress (Designing Women, Diff'rent Strokes, Family Law), endometrial cancer.
Sudhir Dhagamwar, 59, Indian cricketer.
Jim Eames, 92, British Lord Mayor of Birmingham (1974–1975).
David Harvey, 73, British paediatrician.
Arnold Kanter, 65, American diplomat, acute myelogenous leukemia.
Charles Meade, 93, American pastor, founder of Meade Ministries.
Arthur Mercante, Sr., 90, American boxing referee.
Hiro Muramoto, 43, Japanese news cameraman (Reuters), shot.
Martin Ostwald, 88, German-born American classics scholar.
Manfred Reichert, 69, German footballer, after long illness.
Sir Gordon Shattock, 81, British politician, survivor of the Brighton hotel bombing.
William Walker, 78, American opera singer.
Notable Polish people killed in the Polish Air Force Tu-154 plane crash:
Joanna Agacka-Indecka, 45, attorney, President of the Bar Council (since 2007).
Ewa Bąkowska, 47, librarian and activist.
Andrzej Błasik, 47, general, Chief of the Air Force (since 2007).
Krystyna Bochenek, 56, senator, vice president of Senate.
Tadeusz Buk, 49, general, head of Land Forces.
Miron Chodakowski, 52, Orthodox prelate, archbishop of military ordinariate of Poland (since 1998).
Czesław Cywiński, 84, President of the Association of Armia Krajowa Soldiers.
Leszek Deptuła, 57, member of the Sejm.
Grzegorz Dolniak, 50, member of the Sejm.
Janina Fetlińska, 57, senator.
Franciszek Gągor, 58, general, Chief of the General Staff (since 2006).
Grażyna Gęsicka, 58, politician, Minister of Regional Development (2006–2007).
Kazimierz Gilarski, 54, Commander of the Warsaw Garrison.
Przemysław Gosiewski, 45, member of the Sejm, Deputy Prime Minister (2007).
Mariusz Handzlik, 44, diplomat, Undersecretary of State in the Office of the President.
Izabela Jaruga-Nowacka, 59, member of the Sejm, Deputy Prime Minister (2004–2005).
Ryszard Kaczorowski, 90, politician, President in exile (1989–1990).
Maria Kaczyńska, 67, First Lady of Poland (since 2005), wife of Lech Kaczyński.
Lech Kaczyński, 60, President of Poland (since 2005).
Sebastian Karpiniuk, 37, member of the Sejm.
Andrzej Karweta, 51, Vice Admiral, commander-in-chief of the Navy.
Mariusz Kazana, 49, diplomat, Director of Diplomatic Protocol in the Ministry of Foreign Affairs.
Janusz Kochanowski, 69, lawyer and diplomat, Commissioner for Civil Rights Protection (Ombudsman) (since 2006).
Stanisław Komornicki, 85, general, Chancellor of the Order Virtuti Militari.
Stanisław Komorowski, 56, Deputy Defense Minister (since 2007), Ambassador to Holland (1994–1998) and UK (1999–2004).
Andrzej Kremer, 48, lawyer and diplomat, Deputy Foreign Minister (since 2008).
Janusz Kurtyka, 49, historian, president of the Institute of National Remembrance.
Bronisław Kwiatkowski, 59, general, Commander of the Armed Forces Operational Command.
Tomasz Merta, 44, Deputy Minister of Culture and National Heritage.
Aleksandra Natalli-Świat, 51, member of the Sejm.
Piotr Nurowski, 64, sports administrator, head of the Polish Olympic Committee (since 2005).
Bronisława Orawiec-Löffler, 81, dentist and activist.
Maciej Płażyński, 52, member of the Sejm.
Tadeusz Płoski, 54, Roman Catholic prelate, Bishop of military ordinariate of Poland (since 2004).
Włodzimierz Potasiński, 53, Commander of the Special Forces.
Andrzej Przewoźnik, 46, Secretary-General of the Council for the Protection of Struggle and Martyrdom Sites.
Krzysztof Putra, 52, politician, Vice-Marshal of the Sejm (since 2007).
Ryszard Rumianek, 62, rector of the Cardinal Stefan Wyszyński University in Warsaw.
Arkadiusz Rybicki, 57, member of the Sejm.
Wojciech Seweryn, 70, Polish-born American sculptor.
Sławomir Skrzypek, 46, banker, President of National Bank of Poland.
Władysław Stasiak, 44, Chief of the Office of the President.
Aleksander Szczygło, 46, politician, Minister of Defence (2007), chief of the National Security Bureau (since 2009).
Jerzy Szmajdziński, 58, politician, Minister of Defence (2001–2005), Vice-Marshal of the Sejm (since 2007).
Jolanta Szymanek-Deresz, 55, member of the Sejm.
Anna Walentynowicz, 80, trade unionist whose 1980 firing led to the creation of the Solidarity movement.
Zbigniew Wassermann, 60, member of the Sejm.
Wiesław Woda, 63, member of the Sejm.
Edward Wojtas, 55, member of the Sejm.
Paweł Wypych, 42, politician, Secretary of State (since 2009).
Stanisław Zając, 60, senator.
Janusz Zakrzeński, 74, actor.

11
George Roberts Andrews, 78, American diplomat.
John Batchelor, 51, British racing driver and politician, liver disease.
Jean Boiteux, 76, French swimmer, Olympic gold and bronze medalist (1952), fall from a tree.
James Brody, 68, American composer, traffic collision.
Rosa Roberto Carter, 80, Guamanian educator, president of the University of Guam (1977–1983). 
Vicki Draves, 85, American Olympic diver, pancreatic cancer.
Gerhard Geise, 80, German mathematician, after long illness.
Hans-Joachim Göring, 86, German footballer and coach.
Gert Haller, 65, German business manager, lobbyist and politician, after long illness.
Theodor Homann, 61, German footballer, heart failure.
Egon Hugenschmidt, 84, German jurist and politician.
Franz Kamin, 68, American composer, traffic collision.
Alby Linton, 83, Australian footballer.
John B. McCue, 88, American politician, Member of the Pennsylvania House of Representatives.
Ruben Mendoza, 78, American soccer player, cerebral hemorrhage.
Duane D. Pearsall, 88, American inventor of the battery-powered smoke detector.
Julia Tsenova, 61, Bulgarian composer and musician, cancer.
Paz Yrarrázabal, 78, Chilean actress, rheumatoid arthritis.

12
Alper Balaban, 22, German-born Turkish footballer, car accident.
María Aurelia Bisutti, 79, Argentine actress, dementia.
Andrea Cassone, 81, Italian Roman Catholic prelate, archbishop of Rossano-Cariati (1992–2006).
Michel Chartrand, 93, Canadian activist, kidney cancer.
Miguel Cinches, 78, Filipino Roman Catholic prelate, bishop of Surigao (1973–2001).
Ambrosius Eßer, 76, German Dominican clergy and church historian, pulmonary disease.
Wolfgang Graßl, 40, German skier and coach, heart failure.
Peter Haskell, 75, American actor (Child's Play 2).
Edward Huni'ehu, 54, Solomon Islander politician and minister, after long illness.
Běla Kolářová, 87, Czech photographer.
James F. Masterson, 84, American psychiatrist, complications of pneumonia.
Palito, 75, Filipino comedian, respiratory disease.
Robert Pound, 90, Canadian-born American physicist.
Stuart Robbins, 33, British basketball player.
Werner Schroeter, 65, German film director, after long illness.
Arnold Spohr, 86, Canadian artistic director (Royal Winnipeg Ballet), chronic kidney disease.
David B. Stone, 82, American businessman, principal founder of the New England Aquarium, complications from a stroke.
Dale N. Van Vyven, 74, American politician, member of the Ohio House of Representatives (1978–2000).
Udaya Wickramasinghe, 70, Sri Lankan cricket umpire.

13
André Bedoglouyan, 90, Lebanese Eastern Catholic prelate, bishop of Comana Armeniae (1971–1994).
Alexander Bernstein, Baron Bernstein of Craigweil, 74, British television executive and life peer.
Jorge Bontemps, 32, Argentine footballer, lung cancer.
Luis Antonio Chávez, 22, Honduran journalist and children's radio host, shot.
Billy Gore, 90, Welsh rugby player.
Santhosh Jogi, 35, Indian actor, suicide by hanging.
Bernie Kilgariff, 86, Australian politician, Senator (1975–1987).
David C. Knapp, 82, American educator.
Nahid al-Rayyis, 73, Palestinian politician and poet.
Steve Reid, 66, American jazz drummer, throat cancer.
Gerald Stapleton, 89, British airman, RAF fighter ace during World War II.
Charlie Timmins, 87, English footballer (Coventry City), cancer.

14
Israr Ahmed, 77, Indian-born Pakistani Islamic scholar, cardiac arrest.
Binyamin Balanero, 68, Israeli footballer.
René Brunelle, 90, Canadian politician.
Erika Burkart, 88, Swiss author.
Aubrey Cummings, 62, Guyanese musician, heart problems.
Tom Ellis, 86, British politician, MP for Wrexham (1970–1983), founding member of the SDP.
Vicente Haro, 79, Spanish actor.
Gene Kiniski, 81, Canadian professional wrestler, cancer.
Lars-Jacob Krogh, 71, Norwegian anchorman and television presenter, amyotrophic lateral sclerosis.
Alice Miller, 87, Polish-born Swiss author and psychologist.
Russell Olson, 86, American politician, Lieutenant Governor of Wisconsin (1979–1983).
Baruch Poupko, 92, Russian-born American rabbi.
Stefan Schmitt, 46, German jurist and politician, leukemia. 
Mississippi Slim, 66, American blues singer, heart attack.
Greville Starkey, 70, British jockey, cancer.
Peter Steele, 48, American rock singer and bassist (Type O Negative), aortic aneurysm.
Gerhard Zemann, 70, Austrian actor, heart attack.

15
Telman Adigozalov, 56, Azerbaijani actor, heart attack.
Joseph Azzolina, 84, American politician, member of the New Jersey General Assembly (1992–2006), pancreatic cancer.
Ian Brewer, 73, Australian footballer.
Robert Brubaker, 93, American actor (Gunsmoke).
Bill DuBay, 62, American comic book editor, writer, and artist.
Jack Herer, 70, American cannabis activist, complications from heart attack.
Benjamin Hooks, 85, American civil rights leader, executive director of the NAACP (1977–1992), after long illness.
Wilhelm Huxhorn, 54, German footballer, leukemia.
Paul Reeves, 91, American Episcopal prelate, Bishop of Georgia (1969–1985)
Michael Pataki, 72, American character actor and voice actor (George Liquor), cancer.
Peter-Josef Schallberger, 78, Swiss farmer and politician.
Raimondo Vianello, 87, Italian comedian and television personality.
Spann Watson, 93, American airman (Tuskegee Airmen) and civil rights advocate.
Sir Edward Woodward, 81, Australian jurist.

16
Sid Conrad, 86, American actor (The Young and the Restless).
Balthasar Burkhard, 65, Swiss photographer.
Rasim Delić, 61, Bosnian army officer and Chief of Staff, probable heart attack.
Shirlee Emmons, 86, American soprano, voice teacher, and writer.
Ibrahima Fofana, 57, Guinean trade unionist, car accident.
Carlos Franqui, 89, Cuban writer and activist.
Daryl Gates, 83, American police official, chief of police of the Los Angeles Police Department (1978–1992), bladder cancer.
Bryn Knowelden, 90, British rugby league player.
Marion Ladewig, 95, American professional bowler.
Norman Francis McFarland, 88, American Roman Catholic prelate, Bishop of Reno (1976–1986) and Orange (1986–1998).
R. D. Middlebrook, 80, British electrical engineer.
Grigorijs Ņemcovs, 61, Latvian politician, Vice Mayor of Daugavpils, shot.
Muhammad Noer, 92, Indonesian politician, governor of East Java (1967–1976), complications during a medical procedure.
C. K. Prahalad, 68, Indian business consultant and management theorist, natural causes.
C. P. Rele, 82, Indian classical singer.
Arturo Rodríguez Fernández, 62, Dominican author, film critic and playwright, heart failure.
Tomáš Špidlík, 90, Czech Roman Catholic prelate and Cardinal.
John W. Vogt, Jr., 90, American Air Force general.

17
Dede Allen, 86, American film editor (Bonnie and Clyde, Dog Day Afternoon, The Breakfast Club), stroke.
Abdul Rahman Ahmed Jibril Baroud, 73, Palestinian poet, heart attack.
Edmund Fitzgibbon, 85, Irish-born Nigerian Roman Catholic prelate, Bishop of Warri (1991–1997).
Josef W. Janker, 87, German author, journalist and World War II veteran.
Ferenc Kellner, 77, Hungarian Olympic boxer.
Sotigui Kouyaté, 74, Malian-born Burkinabé actor.
Carl Macek, 58, American anime writer and producer (Robotech), heart attack.
Thomas Mikolajcik, 63, American air force general (1992–1996), amyotrophic lateral sclerosis.
Alexandru Neagu, 61, Romanian footballer (FC Rapid București).
Alejandro Robaina, 91, Cuban tobacco grower, cancer.
John Carl Warnecke, 91, American architect (John F. Kennedy Eternal Flame), complications of pancreatic cancer.

18
Michael Adams, 60, American actor and stunt coordinator (Commando, WarGames, In the Line of Fire), stroke.
Abu Abdullah al-Rashid al-Baghdadi, Iraqi terrorist (al-Qaeda), airstrike.
Abu Ayyub al-Masri, Egyptian terrorist (al-Qaeda), airstrike.
William Grant Bangerter, 91, American Mormon leader, President of the Church of Jesus Christ of Latter-day Saints.
Paul Bisciglia, 81, French actor.
Julius Chigbolu, 81, Nigerian Olympic athlete.
Mieczysław Cieślar, 60, Polish Lutheran bishop, car accident.
Ambrose D'Mello, 87, Indian Jesuit priest, first Jesuit Provincial of India, cancer.
Tom Fleming, 82, Scottish actor.
John Forde, Irish Gaelic footballer (Mayo).
Noel Hall, 96, Australian Olympic sport shooter.
Ron Miller, 80, Canadian Olympic athlete.
Allen Swift, 86, American voice actor (Underdog, Howdy Doody, Tom and Jerry ), natural causes.
Viewed, 6, Australian Thoroughbred racehorse, euthanised following a twisted bowel.
William Yates, 88, British-born Australian politician.

19
Manfred Angerer, 56, Austrian musicologist.
José Bernal, 85, Cuban artist, complications from Parkinson's disease.
William Donald Borders, 96, American Roman Catholic prelate, archbishop of Baltimore (1974–1989).
Guru, 48, American rapper (Gang Starr), multiple myeloma.
Hamideh Kheirabadi, 85, Iranian actress, stroke.
Dylan Meier, 26, American college football player, climbing accident.
György Schwajda, 67, Hungarian dramatist and theatre director, after long illness.
George H. Scithers, 80, American science fiction editor, Hugo Award winner, heart attack.
Albert Szatola, 83, Hungarian Olympic equestrian.
Edwin Valero, 28, Venezuelan undefeated former WBA super featherweight and WBC lightweight champion boxer, suicide by hanging.
Carl Williams, 39, Australian criminal, prison assault.
Burkhard Ziese, 66, German football manager.

20
Jimmy Baker, 95,  Australian Aboriginal artist.
Floyd Dominy, 100, American public servant, commissioner of the Bureau of Reclamation (1959–1969).
Sanford Friedman, 81, American novelist.
Heinz Gappmayr, 84, Austrian artist.
Dorothy Height, 98, American civil rights activist.
M. K. Kamalam, 86, Indian actress.
Keli McGregor, 47, American baseball executive (Colorado Rockies), viral myocarditis.
Walter F. Murphy, 80, American political scientist and author, cancer.
Robert Natkin, 79, American abstract painter, bacterial blood infection.
Georgino Orellana, 48, Honduran journalist, shot.
Ahmad Sa'd, 64, Israeli politician, Member of Knesset (1996–1999).
George Torode, 63, Guernseyan author.
Andrea West, 57, Australian politician, member of the House of Representatives (1996–1998), breast cancer.
Myles Wilder, 77, American television comedy writer, diverticulitis.
Lorette Wood, 94, American politician, first female mayor of Santa Cruz, California (1971–1972).
Purvis Young, 67, American painter, cardiac arrest and pulmonary edema.

21
Akua Asabea Ayisi, 83, Ghanaian journalist.
Sammy Baird, 79, Scottish football player and manager.
Krishan Lal Balmiki, 67, Indian politician.
Whitney Robson Harris, 97, American lawyer, last surviving American prosecutor at the Nuremberg Trials, complications from cancer.
Tony Ingham, 85, English footballer, after short illness.
Manfred Kallenbach, 68, German footballer, heart failure.
Gustav Lorentzen, 62, Norwegian singer and entertainer (Knutsen & Ludvigsen).
Mr. Hito, 67, Japanese wrestler.
Sir Laurence Muir, 85, Australian philanthropist and businessman.
Sir Idwal Pugh, 92, British civil servant, Permanent Secretary to the Welsh Office and Health Service Commissioner.
Deborah Remington, 79, American artist, cancer.
Juan Antonio Samaranch, 89, Spanish Olympic official, president of the International Olympic Committee (1980–2001), heart failure.

22
Sparky Adams, 79, American football and baseball coach.
Theodore C. Almquist, 68, American general, colon cancer.
Emilio Álvarez, 71, Uruguayan footballer.
Richard Barrett, 67, American lawyer and white nationalist, stabbed.
Pete Castiglione, 89, American baseball player (Pittsburgh Pirates).
Peter B. Denyer, 56, British engineer, cancer.
Dick Kenworthy, 69, American baseball player.
Gene Lees, 82, Canadian jazz historian and critic, heart disease.
Lina Marulanda, 29, Colombian model, suicide by jumping.
Victor Nurenberg, 79, Luxembourgian footballer.
Ambrose Olsen, 24, American fashion model, suicide.
Fred Panopio, 71, Filipino folk singer, cardiac arrest.
Alicia Parlette, 28, American journalist and copy editor, alveolar soft part sarcoma.
Piet Steenbergen, 81, Dutch footballer (Feyenoord and The Netherlands).
Jean Vergnes, 88, French-born American chef.
Arthur Winograd, 90, American cellist and music director, complications of pneumonia.

23
Lorne Atkinson, 88, Canadian Olympic cyclist.
Jan Balabán, 49, Czech writer, recipient of the Magnesia Litera award.
Shay Duffin, 79, Irish-born American actor (The Departed, Leprechaun, Seabiscuit), complications from heart surgery.
Natalia Lavrova, 25, Russian rhythmic gymnast, Olympic gold medalist (2000, 2004), car accident.
Georgia Lee, 89, Australian jazz and blues singer.
Edward Lyons, 83, British politician, MP for Bradford East (1966–1974) and Bradford West (1974–1983).
Peter Porter, 81, Australian-born British poet, liver cancer.
Alan Rich, 85, American classical music critic, natural causes.
Alexander Sliussarev, 65, Russian photographer and translator.
Sreenath, 52, Indian actor, apparent suicide.
George Townshend, 7th Marquess Townshend, 93, British peer and businessman.

24
Jens Andersen, 80, Danish boxer.
Harry Ashby, 63–64, English golfer.
Harry Conroy, 67, British journalist and trade unionist.
Denis Guedj, 70, French novelist and academic.
Pierre Hadot, 88, French philosopher.
Bo Hansson, 67, Swedish keyboardist.
Leo Löwenstein, 43, German VLN racing driver, race accident.
Angus Maddison, 84, British economist.
Giuseppe Panza, 87, Italian art collector.
Elizabeth Post, 89, American etiquette expert.
Paul Schäfer, 88, German religious sect founder and former Nazi, heart failure.
Wojciech Siemion, 81, Polish actor and film director (The Promised Land, Heroism), car accident.
Rudy Thompson, 80, United States Virgin Islands Olympic sailor.
W. Willard Wirtz, 98, American politician, Secretary of Labor (1962–1969), last surviving member of the Kennedy Cabinet.

25
Ali Aliu, 85, Kosovo Albanian writer, economist, teacher, and political prisoner.
Ugo Anzile, 79, French cyclist.
Joseph Bessala, 69, Cameroonian welterweight boxer, Olympic silver medalist (1968), after short illness.
Ian Lawther, 70, Northern Irish footballer (Sunderland, Blackburn Rovers).
Franklin Mieuli, 89, American businessman, owner of the Golden State Warriors (1962–1985), natural causes.
Dorothy Provine, 75, American actress, (It's a Mad, Mad, Mad, Mad World, That Darn Cat!, The Great Race), emphysema.
Susan Reed, 84, American folk singer and actress, natural causes.
Kevin Restani, 58, American basketball player (Milwaukee Bucks), heart attack.
Volf Roitman, 79, Uruguayan-born American sculptor, painter, novelist, cineaste and poet.
Evry Schatzman, 89, French astrophysicist.
Alan Sillitoe, 82, British writer (Saturday Night and Sunday Morning).
Jeremaia Waqanisau, 62, Fijian soldier and diplomat, heart attack.

26
Mariam A. Aleem, 79, Egyptian artist.
Aminulrasyid Amzah, 14, Malaysian student and victim, shot.
Roy Baird, 76, English production manager, assistant director and producer.
Bus Boyk, 92, American fiddler.
Leslie Buck, 87, American Anthora coffee cup designer, Parkinson's disease.
Ljiljana Buttler, 65, Yugoslavian singer, cancer.
Daniel of Erie, 79, American Orthodox prelate (ROCOR), Titular Bishop of Erie, natural causes.
Paul Engo, 89, Cameroonian diplomat, judge and Olympic athlete.
Denzil Freeth, 85, British politician, MP for Basingstoke (1955–1964).
Luigi Gui, 95, Italian politician, Minister of the Interior (1974–1976).
Fred Halliday, 64, Irish academic, scholar of international relations, cancer.
Derek Hayward, 86, British Anglican priest, Archdeacon of Middlesex (1974–1975).
Frank Olsson, 87, Swedish Olympic rower.
Varkala Radhakrishnan, 82, Indian politician, complications from a road accident.
Prabha Rau, 75, Indian politician, Governor of Rajasthan (since 2009), heart attack.
Joseph W. Sarno, 89, American film director and screenwriter, after short illness.
Alberto Vitoria, 54, Spanish footballer, heart attack.
Yuri Vshivtsev, 70, Russian footballer.
William Arthur Watts, 79, Irish botanist and academic administrator, Provost of Trinity College Dublin (1981–1991).
Aksel C. Wiin-Nielsen, 86, Danish academic, professor of meteorology.

27
Elisabeth Ahlgren, 84, Swedish swimmer.
Robert J. Alexander, 91, American academic.
David Martin Baker, 86, American politician and judge, member of the West Virginia House of Delegates (1953–1954, 1957–1958).
Alberta Cariño, Mexican humanitarian, shot.
Peter Cheeseman, 78, British theatre director, Parkinson's disease.
Stanley Greenspan, 68, American academic, clinical professor of psychiatry.
George Gross, 69, American football player (San Diego Chargers).
Jyri Jaakkola, 33, Finnish humanitarian, shot.
Tanie Kitabayashi, 98, Japanese actress (My Neighbour Totoro), pneumonia.
Bevil Mabey, 94, British businessman.
Morris Pert, 62, British musician.
Nossrat Peseschkian, 76, Iranian-born German psychotherapist.
Armando Sanchez, 57, Filipino politician, governor of Batangas (2004–2007), stroke.
Heini Weber, 86, German Olympic wrestler.

28
Muhammad al-Banki, 46–47, Bahraini philosopher and writer.
Evelyn Cunningham, 94, American journalist, natural causes.
Julio San Emeterio, 80, Spanish cyclist.
Stefania Grodzieńska, 95, Polish writer and actress.
Elma Maua, 61, Cook Islands-born New Zealand journalist and editor, after long illness.
Pierre-Jean Rémy, 73, French writer and diplomat.
Furio Scarpelli, 90, Italian screenwriter (Big Deal on Madonna Street, Casanova 70, Il Postino).
Ian Valz, 52, Guyanese actor and playwright, cancer.

29
Jojo Acuin, 63, Filipino psychic.
Avigdor Arikha, 81, Romanian-born Israeli painter, complications of cancer.
Damodar Chaudhary, 63, Nepalese politician, member of the Constituent Assembly since 2007.
Sandy Douglas, 88, British computer scientist, pneumonia.
Kevin Humphreys, 80, Australian rugby league administrator, after long illness.
Walter Sear, 79, American recording engineer.
Audrey Williamson, 83, British athlete, Olympic silver medalist (1948).

30
Manuel Alvarado, 62, Guatemalan-born British academic.
Tadahiro Ando, 69, Japanese politician, governor of Miyazaki Prefecture (2003–2006), lymphoma.
Cristina Corrales, 47,  Bolivian journalist, broadcaster and politician.
Harry Eccleston, 87, British artist and banknote designer.
Jordi Estadella, 61, Spanish voice actor, radio and television personality (Un, dos, tres... responda otra vez), liver cancer.
Ron Fimrite, 79, American sports journalist (Sports Illustrated), pancreatic cancer.
José Fragelli, 95, Brazilian politician, governor of Mato Grosso (1970–1974) and Senate president (1985–1987).
Carmelita González, 81, Mexican actress, pneumonia.
Antony Grey, 82, British gay rights activist, leukaemia.
Khalid Khawaja, Pakistani military and intelligence officer, shot. (body found on this date)
Paul Mayer, 98, German Roman Catholic prelate and cardinal.
Owsley, 44, American musician, apparent suicide.
Jorma Peltonen, 66, Finnish ice hockey player.
Gwyn Rowlands, 81, English-born rugby football player for Wales.
Gerry Ryan, 53, Irish disc jockey and radio/television presenter.
Wendell J. Westcott, 99, American carillonneur.

References

2010-04
 04